Bantas Fork is a stream in Preble County, Ohio.

Bantas Fork was named for Albert Banta, a pioneer who settled there.

See also
List of rivers of Ohio

References

Rivers of Preble County, Ohio
Rivers of Ohio